Namu'a is a small, uninhabited island off the east coast of Upolu island in Samoa. It is one of four small islands in the Aleipata Islands grouping.

The island is a 10-minute boat ride from Upolu Island, and has beach fale accommodation for visitors. There are several scenic lookout points, and it takes about an hour to walk around the island.

See also

 Samoa Islands
 List of islands
 Desert island

References

Uninhabited islands of Samoa
Atua (district)